Traditional boat race or dragon boat race at the 2005 Southeast Asian Games took place at the La Mesa Dam in the Novaliches Reservoir, Quezon City, Metro Manila, Philippines.

The event was held from December 2–4.

Medal winners

External links
Southeast Asian Games Official Results

2005 Southeast Asian Games events
Boat racing at the Southeast Asian Games